Waheed Murad was a Pakistani actor. This is a list of his awards, honours and recognitions.

Nigar Awards
Winner
 1964 - Best Actor for Heera aur Pathar
 1966 - Best Producer for Armaan
 1969 - Best Actor for Andleeb
 1971 - Best Actor for Mastana Mahi
 2002 - Legend Award for Lifetime achievement

Rooman Awards
Winner
 1965 - Best Actor for Eid Mubarak
 1966 - Best Actor for Armaan
 1966 - Best Producer for Armaan
 1969 - Best Actor for Andleeb
 1974 - Best Actor for Phool Mere Gulshan Ka

Graduate Awards
Winner
 1969 - Best Actor for Andleeb
 1971 - Best Actor for Mastana Mahi
 1975 - Best Actor for Jab Jab Phool Khile

Noor Jahan Awards
Winner
 1966 - Best Actor for Armaan
 1966 - Best Producer for Armaan

Mussawir Awards
Winner
 1975 - Best Actor for Jab Jab Phool Khile
 1983 - Life Time Achievement Award

Sindh Awami Awards
Winner
 1975 - Best Actor for Jab Jab Phool Khile
 1976 - Best Actor for Shabana

PIA Arts Academy Award
Winner
 1978 - Best Actor for Awaz
 1979 - Best Actor for Behen Bhai

AlFankar Awards
Winner
 1978 - Best Actor for Awaz
 1980 - Best Actor for Badnaam

Shabab Awards / Shabab Memorial Awards
Winner
 1967 - Best Actor for Insaniyat
 1985 - Best Supporting Actor for Anokha Daj

Other awards
Winner
 1969 - Chitrali Award: Best Actor for Andleeb
 1969 - Khalil Qaiser Award: Best Actor for Andleeb
 1969 - Curtex Award: Best Actor for Andleeb
 1975 - Aghaz Award: Best Actor for Jab Jab Phool Khile
 1978 - Chaministan International Award for Public Popularity Competition: Most Popular Film Star
 1979 - National Award: Best Actor for Behen Bhai
 1981 - Riaz Shahid Award: Best Actor for Gherao
 1982 - National Academy Award: Best Supporting Actor for Ahat
 2011 - Sitara-e-Imtiaz: Lifetime achievement award
 2012 - 17th PTV Awards: Tribute to Pakistani Legends
 2016 - ARY Film Awards: Legend award

References

Waheed Murad
Murad, Waheed